The Missolonghi Lagoon (Limnothalassa Mesolongiou) is a shallow lagoon located in the south of Aetolia-Acarnania, Western Greece. It is connected to the Gulf of Patras, a bay of the Ionian Sea. It has a triangular shape and its width varies between approximately 15 to 20 km.

Its maximum depth is 5 to 6 metres although mainly it is less than half a metre deep. Several islands surround the lagoon. Near to the coast, the depth is only 10 cm and it is a swampy area. Fish and seaweed live in the lagoon. Strabo called the lake Kynia.

Near the lagoon is the Aitoliko Lagoon to the north. Together they form the Missolonghi–Aitoliko Lagoons complex.

The lagoon was partly drained in the 20th century especially in the western portion in which a part of the land extended southward with farmlands and dikes. The island of Aitoliko or sometimes the peninsula extended by 15 km and 200 m making it the longest extension, the eastern half became a canal and it resembles as a dike.

Islands in Missolonghi lagoon

Dolmas 
Kleisova 
Komma
Prokopanistos 
Schinias
Tourlida 
Vasiladi

References
The first version of the article is translated from the article at the Greek Wikipedia (Main page)

Landforms of Aetolia-Acarnania
Lagoons of Greece
Missolonghi
Ionian Sea